Smilax moranensis is a plant species in the family Smilacaceae. It is native to mountainous areas in Mexico from Sonora and Chihuahua south to Chiapas.

Smilax moranensis is a trailing to climbing vine sometimes reaching a height of 10 m (33 feet). Leaves are broadly ovate, round and the base and slightly  tapering toward the tip. Flowers are born in umbels in the axils of the leaves, each with 6 yellow-green tepals.

Uses
The species is used medicinally throughout much of its range, under the common name zarzaparilla. It is valued for its expectorant, diuretic, and anti-inflammatory properties. It is also reportedly useful in treating Type 2 diabetes.

References

Smilacaceae
Flora of Mexico
Medicinal plants
Plants described in 1842